Come Closer is the debut English language album by Turkish pop singer Tarkan. Album was published in Europe, Asia, Japan, North America, South America, Australia. It was released by Universal Records on April 7, 2006 in Europe and Central Asia. Tarkan began recording the album in 1997, following the success of his third Turkish release Ölürüm Sana that year. Referring to the album's title, Tarkan said:

In August 2005, a number of songs recorded for the album were leaked onto the internet by a Turkish DJ. The leaked songs garnered considerable airplay in dance clubs in Turkey, before Tarkan's management took legal action against the DJs playing the songs.

Track listing

 Come Closer US Remix Editio
Tarkan was about to release his U.S Remix album featuring Wyclef Jean and Miri Ben-Ari. Pete "Boxsta" Martin remixed the entire album. The album was recorded in L.A at Westlake Studio, N.Y at Sony Music Studio and London at The Matrix Studio Complex. Pete remixed the original versions from his debut English album "Come Closer". There were supposed to be two new tracks added in as well.

It was going to be released worldwide in 2008.

Confirmed tracks:
 Just Like That
 In Your Eyes
 Why Don't We? (Aman Aman) (Feat. Wyclef Jean & Filly **)
 Mine
 Over
 Shhh
 Bounce (Feat. Malverde ** & Filly **)
 Come Closer
 Don't Leave Me Alone
 I'm Gonna Make U Feel Good
 Mass Confusion
 If Only You Knew
 Nothing Like You *
 Who's Gonna Love You Now? (Feat. Miri Ben-Ari) *

* New track** New guest artist

Credits and personnel

Lead vocals — Tarkan
Backing vocals — Anas Allaf, Siedah Garrett, Billy Mann
Keyboards —  Pete "Boxsta" Martin, Devrim Karaoglu, Ozan Çolakoğlu, Brian Kierulf, Lester Mendez
Guitar — Anas Allaf, Marc Copely, Brian Kierulf, Billy Mann, Giles Palmer
Drum programming —Pete "Boxsta" Martin, Devrim Karaoglu, Ozan Çolakoğlu
Percussion — Mehmet Akatay, Cengiz Ercumer
Strings — Grup Gündem
Bağlama — Çetin Akdeniz
Programming — Pete "Boxsta" Martin, Devrim Karaoglu, Ozan Çolakoğlu, Brian Kierulf, Lester Mendez

Executive Producer — Tarkan
Mixed by Dexter Simmons
Mastering by Eddie Schreyer
Photography by Tamer Yılmaz
Hair by Yıldırım Özdemir
Make-up by Neriman Eroz
Art direction by Marc Schilkowski

Music videos
 "Bounce"
 "Start The Fire"

Charts

References

External links
tarkan.com — official website.
tarkanmusic.de — official album website.
boxstamusic — official Pete "Boxsta" Martin website.

2006 albums
Tarkan (singer) albums